The 2002–03 season was Tottenham Hotspur's 11th season in the Premier League and 25th successive season in the top division of the English football league system.

Season summary

The 2002–03 campaign, manager Glenn Hoddle's second full season in charge of the team, was considered a major disappointment as the club finished in 10th place in the league table and exited both domestic cup competitions in the early rounds. Striker Robbie Keane, signed from Leeds United for £7,000,000 before the start of the season, was the team's top scorer in the Premier League with 13 goals, while club legend Teddy Sheringham, his final season with the club, scored a credible 13 goals in all competitions.

Squad
Squad at end of season

Transfers

In
  Jamie Redknapp –  Liverpool, 16 April, free
  Milenko Ačimovič –  Red Star Belgrade, 11 May, free
  Rohan Ricketts –  Arsenal, 13 July, free
  Robbie Keane –  Leeds United, 31 August, £7,000,000
  Kazuyuki Toda –  Shimizu S-Pulse, 27 January, loan
  Jonathan Blondel –  Mouscron, 11 July, £2,500,000

Out
  Chris Armstrong –  Bolton Wanderers, 28 August, free
  Oyvind Leonhardsen –  Aston Villa, 30 August, free
  John Piercy –  Brighton & Hove Albion, 20 September, free
  Stephen Clemence –  Birmingham City, 10 January, £900,000
  Les Ferdinand –  West Ham United, 21 January, undisclosed
  Tim Sherwood –  Portsmouth, 11 February, free
  Yannick Kamanan –  Strasbourg

Transfers in:  £9,500,000
Transfers out:  £900,000
Total spending:  £8,600,000

Trialists
  Qu Bo – unsuccessful

Competitions Overview

Results

Premier League

League Cup

FA Cup

League table

Statistics

Appearances

Goal scorers 

The list is sorted by shirt number when total goals are equal.

Clean sheets

References

Tottenham Hotspur
Tottenham Hotspur F.C. seasons